Megachile manyara is a species of bee in the family Megachilidae. It was described by Eardley & R. P. Urban in 2006.

References

Manyara
Insects described in 2006